The 2014 Clásica de San Sebastián was the 34th edition of the Clásica de San Sebastián, a single-day cycling race. It was won by Alejandro Valverde before Bauke Mollema and Joaquim Rodríguez.

Teams
As the Clásica de San Sebastián was a UCI World Tour event, all 18 UCI ProTeams were invited automatically and obligated to send a squad.  were given a wildcard place to form a 19-team peloton.

The 19 teams that competed in the race were:

Results

References

Clásica de San Sebastián
San Sebastian
Clasica de San Sebastian